Dejan  Sobajic is an electrical engineer from Grid Consulting, LLC in San Jose, California. He was named a Fellow of the Institute of Electrical and Electronics Engineers (IEEE) in 2014 for his contributions to applications of neural networks in power engineering.

References

Fellow Members of the IEEE
Living people
Serbian engineers
Year of birth missing (living people)
Place of birth missing (living people)